Charlie Bailey may refer to:
 Charlie Bailey (American football)
 Charlie Bailey (footballer)

See also
 Charles Bailey (disambiguation)